Juan Pablo Plada Ricci (born 6 August 1998) is a Uruguayan footballer who plays as a midfielder for Deportivo Maldonado in the Uruguayan Primera División.

Career

River Plate
A graduate of the club's youth academy, Plada made his debut on 12 February 2019 in a 0-0 draw with Santos during Copa Sudamericana play. He scored his first goal for the club later that season, scoring the opener in the 50th minute of a 2-1 victory over Cerro.

Career statistics

Club

References

External links
Profile at ESPN FC

1998 births
Living people
Club Atlético River Plate (Montevideo) players
Uruguayan Primera División players
Uruguayan footballers
Association football midfielders